The siege of Constantinople in 1203 was a Crusader siege of the capital of the Byzantine Empire, in support of the deposed emperor Isaac II Angelos and his son Alexios IV Angelos. It marked the main outcome of the Fourth Crusade.

Siege 
To take the city by force, the Crusaders first needed to cross the Bosphorus. About 200 ships, horse transports and galleys would undertake to deliver the crusading army across the narrow strait, where Alexios III had lined up the Byzantine army in battle formation along the shore, north of the suburb of Galata. The Crusaders' knights charged straight out of the horse transports, and the Byzantine army fled south. 
The Crusaders followed south, and attacked the Tower of Galata, which held one end of the chain that blocked access to the Golden Horn. The Tower of Galata held a garrison of mercenary troops of English, Danish, and Italian origin. As the crusaders laid siege to the Tower, the defenders routinely attempted to sally out with some limited success, but often suffered bloody losses. On one occasion the defenders sallied out but were unable to retreat back to the safety of the tower in time, the Crusader forces viciously counterattacked, with most of the defenders being cut down or drowning in the Bosporus in their attempts to escape. The Golden Horn now lay open to the Crusaders, and the Venetian fleet entered.

On 11 July the Crusaders took positions opposite the Blachernae palace on the northwest corner of the city. Alexios IV was paraded outside the walls, but the citizens were apathetic, as Alexios III, though a usurper and illegitimate in the eyes of the westerners, was an acceptable emperor for the Byzantine citizens. The siege began in earnest on 17 July, with four divisions attacking the land walls, while the Venetian fleet attacked the sea walls from the Golden Horn. The Venetians took a section of the wall of about 25 towers, while the Varangian Guard held off the Crusaders on the land wall. The Varangians shifted to meet the new threat, and the Venetians retreated under the screen of fire.

Alexios III finally took offensive action, and led 17 divisions from the St. Romanus Gate, vastly outnumbering the Crusaders. Alexios III's army of about 8,500 men faced the Crusader's 7 divisions (about 3,500 men), but his courage failed, and the Byzantine army returned to the city without a fight.

On 18 July 1203 the Crusaders launched an assault on the city, and Alexios III immediately fled into Thrace. The next morning, the Crusaders were surprised to find that the citizens had released Isaac II from prison and proclaimed him emperor, despite the fact that he had been blinded to make him ineligible to rule. The Crusaders forced Isaac II to proclaim his son Alexios IV co-emperor on 1 August, effectively ending the siege.

After the 1203 siege 

Following the end of the first siege of Constantinople in 1203, on 1 August 1203, the pro-Crusader Alexios Angelos was crowned Emperor Alexios IV of the Byzantine Empire, who then tried to stabilize the city. But riots between anti-Crusader Greeks and pro-Crusader Latins broke out later that month and lasted until November, during which most of the populace began to turn against Emperor Alexios IV.

On 25 January 1204, the death of co-Emperor Isaac II set off rioting in Constantinople in which the people deposed Alexios IV, who turned to the Crusaders for help but was imprisoned by the imperial chamberlain, Alexios Doukas, who declared himself Emperor Alexios V on 5 February. Emperor Alexios V then attempted to negotiate with the Crusaders for a withdrawal from Byzantine territory, but they refused to abandon their old treaty with Alexios IV. When Alexios V ordered Alexios IV's execution on 8 February, the Crusaders declared war on Alexios V. In March 1204, the Crusader and Venetian leadership decided on the outright conquest of Constantinople, and drew up a formal agreement to divide the Byzantine Empire between them. By the end of that month, the combined Crusader armies had begun the 1204 siege of Constantinople as Emperor Alexios V began to strengthen the city's defences while conducting more active operations outside the city.

See also
 Siege of Constantinople (1204)
 Siege of Constantinople (1235)

References

External links
 The Latin Occupation in the Greek Lands – The Latin Empire, from the Foundation of the Hellenic World
 

1203
Constantinople 1203
1200s in the Byzantine Empire
Constantinople
Constantinople 1203
Amphibious operations
1203 in Europe
Constantinople